Yellow Card, is a 2000 Zimbabwean comedy romantic drama film directed by John Riber and produced by director himself with his wife Louise Riber. The film stars Leroy Gopal in the lead role whereas Kasamba Mkumba, Collin Sibangani Dube, Dumiso Gumede, Ratidzo Mambo and Kasamba Mkumba made supportive roles. The film revolves around a teenage soccer player who became a father of a beautiful girl after having an unprotected sex with Juliet and then experiencing its consequences.

The film has been shot in Harare, Zimbabwe. The film made its premier on 25 December 2000. The film received mixed reviews from critics.

Cast
 Leroy Gopal as Tiyane Tsumba
 Kasamba Mkumba as Juliet Bester
 Lazarus Boora as Gringo
 Collin Sibangani Dube as Skido
 Dumiso Gumede as Coach
 Ratidzo Mambo as Linda Karombo
 Walter Muparutsa as Tiyane's Father
 Yvette Ogiste-Muchenje as Rita
 Pedzisai Sithole as Nocks

References

External links 
 

Zimbabwean comedy films
2000 films
2000 comedy films
2000s English-language films
Zimbabwean drama films